Minkowice-Kolonia  is a village in the administrative district of Gmina Mełgiew, within Świdnik County, Lublin Voivodeship, in eastern Poland.

References

Minkowice-Kolonia